Basilornis is a genus of mynas in the family Sturnidae. Established by Charles Lucien Bonaparte in 1850, it contains the following species:
Sulawesi myna (Basilornis celebensis)
Long-crested myna (Basilornis corythaix)
Helmeted myna (Basilornis galeatus)
The Apo myna was formerly included in this genus, but has since been transferred to the monotypic genus Goodfellowia.

The name Basilornis is a combination of the Greek words basileus, meaning "king" and ornis, meaning "bird".

References

 
Bird genera
Taxonomy articles created by Polbot
Taxa named by Charles Lucien Bonaparte